Akingbade is a West African surname, which is held by a number of individuals all over the world.

Definition 
The definition of the name Akingbade is “strong/brave one who wears the crown”. Its origin is from the West African language of Yoruba.

A more detailed origin of the surname is situated in the town of Epe (now in Lagos, Nigeria).

History
In ancient times (before the colonization by the British Empire) each town had its own monarchy. Yoruba surnames tell a history of the ancestors. The surname Akingbade comes from the royal family in Epe. It is not entirely clear what the history of the name is but one could assume that centuries ago a battle was fought and one of the Akingbade ancestors managed to seize the monarchy. They were also part of the royal family in Ijero Ekitiand some have standard Origin in Obaagun osun state.

Modern era
However, it is unclear if any active royals still remain in Epe. Many Akingbades now live across the globe with a high percentage in the United Kingdom and the United States.

References

Yoruba-language surnames